The 2018–19 Taça da Liga was the twelfth edition of the Taça da Liga (also known as Allianz Cup for sponsorship reasons), a football cup competition organised by the Liga Portuguesa de Futebol Profissional (LPFP) and contested exclusively by clubs competing in the top two professional tiers of Portuguese football. It began on 21 July 2018 and concluded with the final in Braga on 26 January 2019.

The competition's semi-finals (Benfica v Porto, and Braga v Sporting CP) were marked by controversy involving the video assistant referee (VAR).

In the final, Sporting defeated Porto 3–1 in a penalty shoot-out after a 1–1 draw, becoming the second team (after Benfica) to both defend their title and win the competition multiple times.

Format
The 11 teams placed 4th-16th in the 2017–18 LigaPro (reserve teams from Primeira Liga clubs are excluded) take part in the first round; one-legged ties are played between ten teams, with one team receiving a bye to the next round.

In the second round, the six teams advancing from the previous round (five winners plus the one team with a bye) are joined by the 14 teams placed 5th–18th in the 2017–18 Primeira Liga, by the two teams promoted to 2018–19 Primeira Liga and the team placed third in the 2017–18 LigaPro. Again, one-legged ties were played between 22 teams, with one team receiving a bye to the next round.

The third round features the twelve teams advancing from the previous round (eleven winners plus the one team with a bye) and the four best-placed teams in the 2017–18 Primeira Liga. The 16 teams are drawn into four groups that will be contested in a single round-robin format, with each team playing at least one game at home.

The four group winners qualify for the semi-finals, which are played as single-legged ties. The semi-finals and final are played at a neutral venue, set to be in Braga until 2020.

Tiebreakers
In the third round, teams are ranked according to points (3 points for a win, 1 point for a draw, 0 points for a loss). If two or more teams are tied on points on completion of the group matches, the following criteria are applied to determine the rankings:
highest goal difference in all group matches;
highest number of scored goals in all group matches;
lowest average age of all players fielded in all group matches (sum of the ages of all fielded players divided by the number of fielded players).

In all other rounds, teams tied at the end of regular time contest a penalty shootout to determine the winner. No extra-time is played.

Teams
Thirty-two teams competing in the two professional tiers of Portuguese football for the 2018–19 season are eligible to participate in this competition. For teams in both leagues, the final position in the previous league season determined in which round they enter the competition.

Key
Nth: League position in the 2017–18 season
P1: Promoted to the Primeira Liga
P2: Promoted to the LigaPro
R1: Relegated to the LigaPro

Schedule

First round
The 11 non-reserve teams competing in the 2018–19 LigaPro entered the competition in this round. Ten teams were paired against each other for five single-legged ties, while the eleventh team (Oliveirense) was given a bye to the next round. The draw took place on 11 July 2018, and matches were played on 21 and 22 July 2018. Games tied at the end of regular time were decided by a penalty shootout with no extra-time being played. The first team drawn in each fixture played at home.

Second round
In the second round, the five first-round winners and Oliveirense, who was given a bye to this round, joined the 14 teams ranked 5th–18th in the 2017–18 Primeira Liga, the team ranked 3rd and the two teams promoted from the 2017–18 LigaPro. Twenty two teams were paired against each other for eleven single-legged ties, while Vitória de Setúbal was given a bye to the next round. The draw took place on 11 July 2018, and matches were played between 28 July 2018 and 6 August 2018. Games tied at the end of regular time were decided by a penalty shootout with no extra-time being played. The first team drawn in each fixture played at home.

Third round
In the third round, the 11 second-round winners plus Vitória de Setúbal, who were given a bye to this round, joined the four top-ranked teams from the 2017–18 Primeira Liga: Porto (1st), Benfica (2nd), Sporting CP (3rd) and Braga (4th). These 16 teams were drawn into four groups of four, each group containing one of the four top-ranked Primeira Liga teams who each host their first two group matches. Group matches were played in a single round-robin format, ensuring that each team played at least one match at home.

For the draw, the teams were seeded into four pots based on their league position in the previous season, with the teams participating in the 2017–18 Primeira Liga being seeded higher regardless of any relegation. The fixtures and match dates were decided by an additional draw.

Group A

Notes:

Group B

Group C

Group D

Knockout phase
The knockout phase was contested as a final-four tournament by the four third-round group winners in one-legged semi-finals and final. All matches were played in a neutral venue, decided before the competition starts. As in the first and second round, games tied at the end of regular time were decided by a penalty shootout with no extra-time being played.

The first semi-final was played between the winners of Groups A (Benfica) and C (Porto), while the second was played between Group B (Braga) and D (Sporting CP) winners. Groups A and B winners (Benfica and Braga, respectively) were designated as the "home" teams (for administrative purposes) in their semi-final clashes as was the winner of the first semi-final in the final. If the team that played at home in the appointed neutral stadium was still in competition, in this case Braga, they were designated the home team regardless of which group or semi-final they played.

All matches were played at Estádio Municipal de Braga, in Braga, with the semi-finals played on 22 and 23 January, and the final on 26 January 2019.

Semi-finals

Final

References

External links
 LPFP page 

Taça da Liga
Taca da Liga
Portugal